Pronophila isobelae, or Isobel's butterfly, is a Satyrinae butterfly that is found in Ecuador.

Discovered by World Wildlife Fund conservationist Paul Toyne in 1998, it was initially named Pronophila benevola.

The WWF held a competition to name the butterfly, and the species was named after the winner Isobel Talks (being named Pronophila isobelae).

As of July 2011, there have only been six sightings of the male of the species, and no confirmed sightings of the female.

Appearance

Male 
 Wing colouring: dark brown and chestnut
 Wingspan: 
 Markings: bright white tip on forewings

Female 
 Not known

See also 
Satyrinae
Nymphalidae

References 

Pronophila
Nymphalidae of South America